Dragonroar is a role-playing game published by Standard Games in 1985.

Description
Dragonroar is an introductory level miniatures-oriented fantasy system, emphasizing combat between heroes and monsters. The game includes a rulebook, an introductory adventure, 25mm-scale floor plans, and a cassette tape introducing the game (side one) and the scenario (side two).

The rulebook includes a map of "Home" (the Dragonroar campaign world) in its center. A character in Dragonroar has five characteristics: Strength, Speed, Willpower, Knowledge and Endurance, and must be either a Warrior or a Wizard. Characters improve by acquiring honour points, which are used to advance in "Life Level". The skills system is organized in a set of hierarchies becoming more specialized as the player character moves down the hierarchy.

Publication history
Dragonroar was published by Standard Games in 1985 as a boxed set containing a rulebook, a cassette tape, 24 character/monster sheets, four cardstock sheets, cardstock miniatures, a scenario map, and dice. Dragonroar was the first major British fantasy role-playing game.

Reception
Paul Mason reviewed Dragonroar for White Dwarf #68 (August 1985), giving it an overall score of 5 out of 10. He concludes his review by saying: "As a beginner's game, Dragonroar is clear and simple, but narrow in scope and restricting to those who want more out of game than combat: experienced role-players will find it about five years out of date. It may be the first British fantasy rolegame, but it isn't anything to be proud of."

Reviews
Jeux & Stratégie #32

References

British role-playing games
Fantasy role-playing games
Role-playing games introduced in 1985